Southwest Texas Junior College (SWTJC) is a public community college with four campuses serving 11 counties in southwest Texas: unincorporated Uvalde County (next to Uvalde and on the site of Garner Field), Del Rio (northwest portion), next to Del Rio International Airport, unincorporated Maverick County (near Eagle Pass), and Crystal City, the seat of Zavala County.

Its service area, according to the Texas Education Code, in addition to Uvalde, Val Verde, Maverick, and Zavala Counties,  includes Dimmit, Edwards, Frio, Kinney, La Salle, Medina, and Real.

Notable alumni
Tracy King, member of the Texas House of Representatives from District 80

Uvalde campus gallery

References

External links

Official website

Education in Uvalde County, Texas
Education in Val Verde County, Texas
Education in Maverick County, Texas
Education in Zavala County, Texas
Universities and colleges accredited by the Southern Association of Colleges and Schools
Community colleges in Texas
Two-year colleges in the United States
Uvalde, Texas